Nicholas John Birkmyre (born 21 February 1937) is a former  rower who competed for Great Britain in the 1960 Olympic games and won Double Sculls Challenge Cup at Henley Royal Regatta four times.

Biography
Birkmyre was born at Cranleigh, Surrey, and was educated at Radley College. He became a member of Bristol Ariel Rowing Club. In 1959, partnering George Justicz, he was runner up at the Double Sculls Challenge Cup at Henley Royal Regatta.  In 1960 the pair won the Double Sculls Challenge Cup and went on to compete in the double sculls at the 1960 Summer Olympics in Rome, where they did not advance beyond the repechage. Birkmyre and Justicz won the double sculls at Henley again in 1961 and won a silver medal at the 1961 European Rowing Championships. They then joined Leander Club and in 1962 won the double sculls at Henley, came fifth in the 1962 World Rowing Championships.

He represented England and won a gold medal in the double sculls at the 1962 British Empire and Commonwealth Games in Perth, Western Australia. They made their final winning appearance in the double sculls at Henley 1964.

Birkmyre became a farmer at Great Witley, Worcestershire and has been an active supporter of the community.

References

1937 births
English male rowers
British male rowers
Rowers at the 1960 Summer Olympics
Olympic rowers of Great Britain
People from Cranleigh
Living people
People educated at Radley College
20th-century English farmers
People from Malvern Hills District
Rowers at the 1962 British Empire and Commonwealth Games
Commonwealth Games medallists in rowing
Commonwealth Games gold medallists for England
European Rowing Championships medalists
Medallists at the 1962 British Empire and Commonwealth Games
21st-century English farmers